Bangkok International Preparatory and Secondary School, or Bangkok Prep, is an independent international school based on the National Curriculum of England located in Bangkok, Thailand. Established in 2003, the school is now in its 18th year. 1,250 students are enrolled at Bangkok Prep, representing 42 nationalities.

History
Bangkok International Preparatory and Secondary School was established by two educators: Magdalena Urioste and Patrada Yomnak, who had extensive experience of international kindergartens, both in Bangkok and Hanoi, for more than 20 years. In 2003, Magdalena and Patrada founded an extension on Thong-Lo for their kindergarten students to continue on to Primary level. This soon evolved into Bangkok Prep

Bangkok Prep was officially ordained by Her Royal Highness Princess Maha Chakri Sirindhorn in June 2006. In the 2009-2010 academic year, Bangkok Prep was the recipient of The Prime Minister's Export Award 2009 in International Education. The school won an award for "Outstanding Achievement in School Development and Management" at the World Education/Education Living Expo in 2010.

In 2012, Prime Minister Abhisit Vejjajiva was an inaugural guest speaker for Bangkok Prep's first graduating class. Today, there were 7 batches of more than 200 students who have graduated from Bangkok Prep. Students had been accepted into many notable universities worldwide such as Imperial College London, London School of Economics, University College of London, New York University (NYU), University of California, Los Angeles (UCLA), etc.

Academics and curriculum
Bangkok Prep follows an international curriculum primarily based on the National Curriculum of England, offering education to pupils from Nursery up to Year 13.

The school is divided into three sections: Early Years (Nursery and Reception), the Primary school (Year 1 to Year 6), and the Secondary school (Year 7 to Year 13).

The Early Years unit follows the English National Early Years Foundation Stage Programme (EYFS) for children aged between 3 and 5 years.

The Primary school and Secondary school are based on the National Curriculum of England.

 Key Stage 1: Year 1 and Year 2 classes. 
 Key Stage 2: Year 3 to Year 6 classes. 
 Key Stage 3: Years 7 to 9 and is the final preparation for the examination phase.
 Key Stage 4: Years 10 and 11. It is the examination phase and Bangkok Prep is registered with the Cambridge International Examinations which is part of the University of Cambridge in the UK as an examination centre for the International General Certificate in Secondary Education or IGCSE. An IGCSE programme is offered to Year 10 and Year 11 students as a precursor to the Cambridge-approved A-levels available to study in Year 12 and Year 13, thus preparing students towards university education.
 Key Stage 5 is the advanced level examination phase, which is Years 12 and 13 or Sixth Form. Students begin to specialize in their studies and opt for subjects that will guide their choice of study at undergraduate level in university. Students are examined at the end of Year 13 on a minimum of one and a maximum of four GCE A-Level examinations, administered by CIE, like the IGCSEs.

Professional accreditation 
The school received triple accreditation from the  Council of International Schools (CIS), New England Association of Schools and Colleges (NEASC) and Office for National Education Standards and Quality Assessment (ONESQA) in 2011. The school is a member of the International Schools Association of Thailand (ISAT), Federation of British International Schools in Asia (FOBISIA), Bangkok International Schools Athletic Conference (BISAC) and Thailand International Schools Activity Conference (TISAC) as well as the Cambridge University-approved IGCSE and A-level examination center. Eco Schools Green Flag Award (Bangkok Prep were the first school in Thailand to be awarded Green Flag status – which is the highest recognition) and the Duke of Edinburgh International Award.

School publications
Primary and Secondary Weekly Bulletins, Prepazine, a yearbook, Prep Gazette, and a school prospectus.

References

External links
Official site

International schools in Bangkok
Cambridge schools in Thailand
2003 establishments in Thailand
Educational institutions established in 2003
Private schools in Thailand